Mohammadabad-e Sofla (also Romanized as Moḩammadābād-e Soflá; also known as Moḩammadābād-e Pā’īn) is a village in Deh Chah Rural District, Poshtkuh District, Neyriz County, Fars Province, Iran. At the 2006 census, its population was 33, in 9 families.

References 

Populated places in Neyriz County